Ever Circling Wolves (commonly abbreviated as ECW) is a Finnish doom metal quartet formed in Helsinki in 2007.

History

Formation and The Silence from Your Room 
Ever Circling Wolves was originally a solo project of Henri Harell that was put together in early 2007, when Harell started to write songs that didn't fit the style of Morg, a death metal band he was in. These songs were released as an EP in summer 2007, after which Harell began to seek for musicians with whom he could perform his music.

In fall 2008, after numerous changes, the lineup stabilized. In addition to Harell, the band now included Otto Forsberg, Arttu Kantola and Niko Karjalainen. The band's dynamic began to shift from Harell's solo-project-approach to a more democratic one, and in summer 2009, the band released its first full-length album, The Silence from Your Room. The album was mainly composed by Harell, but it featured also considerable output from the rest of the band.

Chapter III 

In 2010, Kantola quit the band due to commitments elsewhere, and was replaced by Sami Nevala. Later that year, the band recorded Chapter III, an EP that included a new song and a re-recorded song from the 2007 EP. The EP was released as a digital release in early 2011 and a year later, in Christmas 2011, the album was released in a CD format.

Currently the band is recording new songs for an upcoming album. As an immediate aftermath of the initial drum recordings, a digital EP was released, containing two songs recorded as full band live takes.

Discography
Picturesque, Petrified EP (2007, self-released)
The Silence from Your Room (2009, self-released)
Chapter III EP (2010, self-released)
Live @ Studio 2012 (2012, digital release)

Band members

Current members
Henri Harell – lead vocals, guitars (2007–present)
Otto Forsberg – guitars (2008–present)
Niko Karjalainen – drums (2008–present)
Sami Nevala – bass (2010–present)

Former members
Jukka Aho – drums (2007, 2008)
Turkka Harell - drums(2007–2008)
Arttu Kantola – bass (2008-2010)
Kaisa Kelahaara - guitar (2008)
Terhi Savela - bass (2007-2008)
Jere Sjöblom - guitar (2007)
Touring musicians
Lari Venho – bass (2010)

References

External links

Finnish doom metal musical groups